Round Mound may refer to:

Round Mound of Rebound
Round Mound of Sound (disambiguation)
Roundmound, Kansas